E, moj narode (Hey, my people) is an album of the Croatian band Thompson. It was released in 2002.

The song "Moj Ivane" is originally a Croatian folk song from Kupres, Bosnia and Herzegovina. Thompson's modernized version greatly popularized it. The song is part of the band's regular repertoire.

"Reci, brate moj" is a duet with Miroslav Škoro. "Stari se" was written and composed for Thompson by Siniša Vuco.

Track listing
 "Iza devet sela" (Behind nine villages) (4:00)
 "Ne varaj me" (Don't deceive me) (4:15)
 "E, moj narode" (Oh, My People) (4:56)
 "Neću izdat ja" (I won't betray) (4:08)
 "Zeleno je bilo polje" (Green was the field) (4:08)
 "Radost s visina" (The joy from above) (4:58)
 "Reci, brate moj" (Say, my brother) (4:25)
 "Moj Ivane" (My Ivan) (3:33)
 "Ne pitaj mene" (Don't ask me) (4:10)
 "Stari se" (Getting old) (3:45)
 "Lijepa li si [s gostima]" (You are beautiful [with guest singers]) (4:18)
 "Geni kameni [uživo]" (Genes of stone [live]) (6:02)

References

2002 albums
Thompson (band) albums